WRC-TV (channel 4) is a television station in Washington, D.C., serving as the market's NBC outlet. It is owned and operated by the network's NBC Owned Television Stations division alongside Class A Telemundo outlet WZDC-CD (channel 44). WRC-TV and WZDC-CD share studios on Nebraska Avenue in the Tenleytown neighborhood of Northwest Washington. Through a channel sharing agreement, the stations transmit using WRC-TV's spectrum from a tower adjacent to their studios.

History

The station traces its roots to experimental television station W3XNB, which was put on the air by the Radio Corporation of America, the then-parent company of NBC, in 1939. A construction permit with the commercial callsign WNBW (standing for "NBC Washington") was first issued on channel 3 (60–66 MHz, numbered channel 2 prior to 1946) on December 23, 1941. NBC requested this permit to be cancelled on June 29, 1942; later, the channel 3 allocation was reassigned to Harrisonburg, Virginia, on which the former Shennandoah Valley Broadcasting Company launched WSVA-TV (now WHSV-TV) in 1953.

On June 27, 1947, WNBW was re-licensed on channel 4 and signed on the air. Channel 4 is the second-oldest commercially licensed television station in Washington, after WTTG (channel 5), which signed on seven months earlier in December 1946. WNBW was also the second of the five original NBC-owned television stations to sign-on, behind WNBT in New York City and ahead of WNBQ in Chicago, WNBK in Cleveland and KNBH in Los Angeles. The station was operated alongside WRC radio (980 AM, now WTEM, and 93.9 FM, now WKYS).

On October 18, 1954, the television station's callsign changed to the present WRC-TV to match its radio sisters. The new calls reflected NBC's ownership at the time by RCA. It has retained its "-TV" suffix to this day, nearly four decades after the radio stations were sold off and changed call letters. The WNBW call sign was later used for the NBC affiliate in Gainesville, Florida since the station's launch in 2008.

In 1955, while in college and serving as a puppeteer on a WRC-TV program, Jim Henson was asked to create a puppet show for the station. The series he created, Sam and Friends, was the first series to feature the Muppets, and launched the Jim Henson Company.

The second presidential debate between candidates John F. Kennedy and Richard M. Nixon was broadcast from the station's studios on October 7, 1960. David Brinkley's Washington segment of the Huntley-Brinkley Report originated at WRC-TV between 1956 and 1970, as did Washington reports or commentaries by Brinkley or John Chancellor on NBC Nightly News in the 1970s.

The earliest color videotape in existence is a recording of the dedication of WRC-TV's Washington studios on May 22, 1958. President Dwight D. Eisenhower spoke at the event, introduced by NBC President Robert W. Sarnoff. Before Eisenhower spoke, Sarnoff pushed a button, which converted the previously black and white signal into color. It was also the first time a U.S. president had been videotaped in color.

At the time of its sign-on, channel 4 was one of two wholly network-owned stations in Washington, the other being DuMont's WTTG. DuMont was shut down in 1956, and for the next 30 years, WRC-TV was Washington's only network owned-and-operated station.

From the opening of its Nebraska Avenue facility in 1958 through 2020, WRC-TV housed NBC News' Washington bureau, out of which the network's long-running political affairs program Meet the Press was based. In January 2021, NBC News moved the bureau near Capitol Hill.

Telemundo affiliation
In September 2017, NBC announced they were to launch a new Telemundo owned-and-operated station based out of WRC-TV. ZGS Communications, owner of Washington's existing Telemundo affiliate WZDC-CD (channel 25), sold the station's channel allocation in the Federal Communications Commission (FCC)'s 2017–18 incentive auction, accepting a $66 million payout to turn off its signal and continue operations by sharing the channel of another station. A Telemundo spokesperson stated that the sale of WZDC's spectrum "gave us the ability to take back the Telemundo affiliation for this market," without elaborating what that meant. NBC later purchased WZDC-CD with the intention of moving its over-the-air signal to that of WRC-TV through a channel-sharing agreement.

NBC took control of WZDC-CD on January 1, 2018, and added a temporary relay to WRC-TV's digital subchannel 4.3. The channel-sharing agreement took effect on March 7, 2018. Under the agreement, WZDC shares WRC-TV's physical signal as a subchannel would and is managed with its own virtual channel number and license. WZDC's virtual channel changed from 25.1 to 44.1 to avoid a conflict with WDVM-TV, which also occupies virtual channel 25.1.

Programming

As of September 2022, syndicated programs broadcast by WRC-TV include Access Hollywood and The Kelly Clarkson Show (both are produced by sister station KNBC).

Because of its ownership by the network, WRC-TV generally carries the entire NBC network schedule, though the station airs an alternate live feed of NBC Nightly News at 7 p.m. (rather than 6:30 p.m. as with most NBC stations in the Eastern Time Zone), due to a longtime hour-long 6 p.m. newscast. The weekend edition of the network's newscast airs at its usual 6:30 p.m. time slot. Like network flagship WNBC, it airs Meet the Press an hour-and-a-half later than most NBC affiliates in the Eastern Time Zone due to a two-hour Sunday morning newscast.

WRC-TV previously housed It's Academic, which premiered in 1961 and is the longest-running game show in television history according to the Guinness Book of World Records (as of October 29, 2022, it is now aired on PBS member station WETA-TV). Sam and Friends, Jim Henson's late-night precursor to Sesame Street and The Muppet Show, got its start on WRC-TV on May 9, 1955. WRC-TV served as the production facilities for the original run of The McLaughlin Group from its premiere in 1982 until May 2008, when the production facilities moved to Tegna Inc.-owned CBS affiliate and WRC-TV's rival WUSA and it remained until the original show's ending in 2016.

Sports programming
WRC-TV has been the over-the-air home of Washington Commanders (formerly the Washington Redskins) preseason games since 2009. Before the Comcast–NBC Universal merger, games were only shown in standard definition on WRC, with actual rights-holder CSN Mid-Atlantic (now NBC Sports Washington) exclusively airing the high definition broadcast.

Until 2021, the station also aired Washington Capitals games through NBC's broadcast contract with the NHL; this included the team's Stanley Cup Finals victory in 2018.

News operation

WRC-TV presently broadcasts 45 hours of locally produced newscasts each week (with 7 hours, 35 minutes each weekday; three hours on Saturdays and five hours on Sundays). By 2001, WRC's newscasts had all been rated number one in the market, with some of the success attributed to Jim Vance and Doreen Gentzler, who anchored together from 1989 until Vance's death in 2017. Vance had been with Channel 4 since 1969, and was promoted to anchor three years later. In the May 2010 sweeps, it placed first at 5:00 a.m., 6:00 a.m., 6:00 p.m. and 11:00 p.m. in total viewers, and first at 6:00 a.m., 6:00 p.m. and 11:00 p.m. in the 25–54 demo. It still leads most time slots today, although WTTG's morning news and WJLA's 11:00 pm news have given it much competition in the 25–54 demo.

In 1974, WRC-TV adopted the NewsCenter branding, following the three other NBC-owned stations at the time in New York, Los Angeles and Chicago in adopting the NewsCenter branding.

In 1975, the station adopted MFSB's song "My Mood" as the closing theme music for the 6:00 p.m. newscast every Friday, which remains in use by the station today. Michael Randall commissioned the news theme for WRC-TV entitled "NewsCenter Theme", which was used by the station until 1986; also, Charlie Rose was hired by WRC-TV after his short stint at KXAS-TV in Dallas and hosted the Charlie Rose Show from its premiere in 1980 until he left the station in 1984 for CBS News. The station also hired George Michael as sports anchor, eventually launching the nationally syndicated program The George Michael Sports Machine, which originated from the studios of WRC-TV from its entire run from 1984 until 2007 (The George Michael Sports Machine was distributed by the station's sister company NBCUniversal Television Distribution).

In 1982, after 8 years of using the NewsCenter branding, the news branding was changed to Channel 4 News. The station added a 5:00 p.m. newscast in 1984. On September 7, 1987, the station changed its news branding to News 4. In 1989, the station used a new promotional campaign "We Work Well Together", produced by Music Oasis, which was also adopted as its news theme until 1992. In 1991, WRC-TV added a morning newscast under the title of News 4 Today. From January 14 to October 25, 1991, the station also produced a 7:30 p.m. newscast for then-independent station WFTY (now CW affiliate WDCW) entitled 7:30 News Headlines. The newscast suffered low ratings throughout its run.

In 1993, the station adopted the news music theme entitled "Working 4 You", which also serves as a current station slogan for News 4. In 1994, WRC-TV expanded a late weekday newscast from 4:30 p.m. to a full-hour at 4 p.m. 615 Music remixed the theme in 1997, this time under the title of "Working For You". The theme was also used by other NBC affiliates (including WHO-TV in Des Moines, Iowa, KPLC in Lake Charles, Louisiana, WPSD-TV in Paducah, Kentucky and WEAU in Eau Claire, Wisconsin). In 2002, WRC-TV adopted "The Tower" news theme commissioned by 615 Music from Chicago sister station WMAQ-TV with the notes of the "Working For You" theme as a musical trademark added only in the news opens. The "Working For You" theme continued to be used as a closing theme for all of its newscasts. Both "Working For You" and "The Tower V.1 with Working For You" were both in use by the station until 2008, when they switched to Gari Media Group's "The NBC Collection" now with added notes of the "Working For You" theme.

On January 14, 2009, WRC-TV and WTTG entered into a Local News Service (called LNS) agreement in which the two stations pool video and share news helicopter footage. The agreement is similar to ones already made between Fox and NBC owned-and-operated stations in Chicago (WMAQ-TV and WFLD) and Philadelphia (WCAU and WTXF). WUSA later joined that agreement. In 2012, News Director Camille Edwards announced the station would no longer participate in LNS, but the stations would continue to share the helicopter. In 2016, the station launched its own helicopter, Chopper4.

On April 8, 2010, the station began test broadcasts of its news programming in high definition during local news updates seen during Today; regular newscasts continued to be broadcast in standard definition. WRC-TV started broadcasting its newscasts from a temporary set on February 8, 2010, while "upgrades" were being made on its main set and the station made final adjustments for its switch to high definition. On April 22, 2010, WRC became the fourth (and final) English-language television station in the Washington, D.C. market to begin broadcasting its local newscasts in high definition. It is the only station in the Washington market that shoots most of its remote field video in 16:9 widescreen; other stations still shoot live field video in 4:3 and then either pillarbox or stretch this content to widescreen—though WRC's field video is shot in standard definition.

On September 15, 2014, the station's newscasts shifted to a full 16:9 widescreen presentation, therefore becoming the third English-language television station in the Washington, D.C. market to do so, following Tegna-owned CBS affiliate WUSA (January 2013) and Fox-owned WTTG (August 2013).  In conjunction with this, the newscast title was changed to a variation of the station's NBC 4 logo and also, its longtime newscast theme music was heavily updated.  Also, the station's "Look F" graphics package from NBC ArtWorks, which was introduced 2 years earlier (May 2012), was reformatted for the 16:9 presentation.

On June 29, 2016, the station officially began using the "Look N" graphics package that was first adopted by sister station WNBC (which began using the package on June 11), becoming the sixth NBC-owned station to use this package, following WVIT (June 13), WTVJ (also on June 13), KXAS-TV (June 20) and WMAQ-TV (testing on June 21; full usage beginning June 28).

On July 31, 2017, WRC-TV became the first station in Washington, D.C. to expand its morning newscasts to 4:00 a.m. In May 2018, after 10 years of using "The NBC Collection with Working for You" news theme, the station brought back 615 Music's "The Tower" news theme, this time without the famous "Working for You" musical trademark; the news theme was previously used with the "Working for You" signature only in the news opens from 2002 until 2008; the theme has also been used by sister station WVIT since 2016.

On October 19, 2021, WRC-TV became the last station in the group to introduce their "Look S" graphics, beginning with the 4:00 p.m. ET newscast.

Starting with News 4 Today on February 27, 2023, WRC-TV's newscasts moved to a new studio that formerly housed Meet the Press, where an entirely new set debuted for the first time in almost 13 years.

Notable current on-air staff
 Leon Harris – anchor
 Tony Perkins – anchor
 Eun Yang – anchor

Notable former on-air staff
 Miguel Almaguer – reporter (2006–2009); now with NBC News
 Jess Atkinson – sports anchor (1990–1996); now back at his Alma mater, the University of Maryland
 Shannon Bream – anchor (2004–2007); now with Fox News Channel
 Nick Charles – sports anchor/reporter (1976–1979); died of cancer on June 25, 2011
 Katie Couric – reporter (1987–1989); later co-anchor of NBC's Today, anchor of CBS Evening News, host of syndicated talk show, global news correspondent with Yahoo News and ABC News
 Lindsay Czarniak – sports anchor/reporter (2005–2011); was most recently with ESPN until October 2017, now with Joe Gibbs Racing and Fox Sports
 Steve Doocy – features reporter (1983–1989); now with Fox News Channel
 Peter Ford – news anchor (1988–1992); now CEO of Control Bionics Neural System Technologies
 Doreen Gentzler – anchor (1989–2022); retired
 Angie Goff – anchor (2011–2018); now with WTTG
 Savannah Guthrie – reporter (1999–2002); now co-anchor of NBC's Today Show
 Robert Hager – reporter in the 1960s, later an NBC News correspondent
 Mike Hambrick – anchor (1982–1985); now heard on Howard 100 and Howard 101
 Steve Handelsman – reporter (1984–2017); retired
 Richard C. Harkness – Washington correspondent for NBC network and local radio/TV news anchor (1942–1970); died in 1977
 Jim Hartz – anchor (1977–1979); died in April 2022
 Dan Hellie – sports anchor (2006–2013); now with NFL Network
 Joe Johns – reporter (1983–1993); now with CNN
 Veronica Johnson – meteorologist (2000–2016); now with WJLA-TV
 Susan King – anchor/reporter (1983–1987); now a dean at the UNC Hussman School of Journalism and Media
 Joe Krebs – anchor/reporter (1980–2012); died of pancreatic cancer on April 6, 2021
 Suzanne Malveaux – reporter (1996-1999); was most recently at CNN
 Dave Marash – anchor (1985–1989); now with KSFR
 Marjorie Margolies – reporter (1975–1990); former U.S. Congresswoman and mother-in-law of Chelsea Clinton
 Doug McKelway – anchor/reporter (1992–2001); was most recently at Fox News Channel
 Craig Melvin – anchor (2007–2011); now NBC News and Today Show anchor
 George Michael – sports anchor/reporter; former host of The George Michael Sports Machine (1980–2008); died of leukemia on December 24, 2009
 Wendy Rieger – anchor (1988–2021); died of glioblastoma on April 16, 2022
 Bob Ryan – chief meteorologist (1980–2010); retired
 Jim Rosenfield – anchor (2012–2013); now with WCAU (WRC-TV's sister station) in Philadelphia
 Dianna Russini – sports anchor/reporter (2013–2015); now with ESPN
 Willard Scott – NBC page (1950), Bozo the Clown (1959–1962), weather anchor (1968–1980); later on NBC's Today Show; died of natural causes on September 4, 2021
 Sue Simmons – anchor/reporter (1976–1980); retired
 Jim Vance – anchor (1969–2017); died of cancer on July 22, 2017

Technical information

Subchannels
The station's digital signal is multiplexed:

Analog-to-digital conversion
WRC-TV shut down its analog signal, on VHF channel 4, on June 12, 2009, the official date in which full-power television stations in the United States transitioned from analog to digital broadcasts under federal mandate. The station's digital signal continued to broadcast on its pre-transition UHF channel 48. Through the use of PSIP, digital television receivers display the station's virtual channel as its former VHF analog channel 4.

The station participated in the "Analog Nightlight" program, with its analog signal carrying information on the digital transition until analog signal broadcasts were permanently discontinued on June 26, 2009.

Beginning in 1996, WRC-TV's studios were the home of WHD-TV, an experimental high definition television station owned by a consortium of industry groups and stations which carried the nation's first program in the format transmitted by a television station, an episode of Meet the Press, and aired on UHF channel 34 to provide the FCC and the National Association of Broadcasters a channel to conduct many experiments in the new format. WHD-TV was discontinued around 2002.

References

External links

 

Cozi TV affiliates
LX (TV network) affiliates
NBC network affiliates
NBC Owned Television Stations
Television channels and stations established in 1947
RC-TV
1947 establishments in Washington, D.C.
Former General Electric subsidiaries